Odlabari (also spelled Oodlabari)  is a census town in the Mal CD block in the Malbazar subdivision of the Jalpaiguri district  in the state of West Bengal, India.

Geography

Location

Area overview
Gorumara National Park has overtaken traditionally popular Jaldapara National Park in footfall and Malbazar has emerged as one of the most important towns in the Dooars. Malbazar subdivision is presented in the map alongside. It is a predominantly rural area with 88.62% of the population living in rural areas and 11.32% living in the urban areas. Tea gardens in the Dooars and Terai regions produce  or over a quarter of India's total tea crop.  Some tea gardens were identified in the 2011 census as census towns or villages. Such places are marked in the map as CT (census town) or R (rural/ urban centre). Specific tea estate pages are marked TE.

Note: The map alongside presents some of the notable locations in the subdivision. All places marked in the map are linked in the larger full screen map.

Demographics
As per the 2011 Census of India, Odlabari had a total population of 14,194.  There were 7,182 (51%) males and 7,012 (49%) females. There were 1,696 persons in the age range of 0 to 6 years. The total number of literate people in Odlabari was 9,592 (76.75% of the population over 6 years).

Infrastructure
Among the civic amenities, it had  roads with both open and covered drains, the protected water supply involved river infiltration gallery, service reservoir, tap water from treated sources, uncovered well. It had 1,200 domestic electric connections. Among the medical facilities it had 1 hospital, 1 dispensary/ health centre, 1 veterinary hospital, and 8 medicine shops. Among the educational facilities it had 4 primary schools, 3 middle schools, 3 secondary schools, 2 senior secondary schools, and 1 non-formal education centre (Sarvya Siksha Abhiyan). Among the social, cultural and recreational facilities, it had 1 cinema theatre, 1 public library, and 1 reading room. It had branches of 1 nationalised bank and 1 cooperative bank.

Economy
Oodlabari is surrounded by many tea estates such as Ranichera, Rungamatee, Gurjanjhora and Oodlabari - sights which can make any tea lover delighted about a visit.  There are about 150 tea estates in the Dooars. Among them, Oodlabari Tea Estate deserves a special mention as it ranks amongst the few fine green-tea producing gardens.

Transport
There is a station at Odlabari Railway Station on the New Jalpaiguri-Alipurduar-Samuktala Road line.

Tourism
Oodlabari offers some of the most spectacular sights in the Dooars region. The rivers Leesh and Chel are on either side of the town. About  to the south are the forests of Baikunthapur with the Kathambari range that is home to Asiatic elephants. One can visit the Teesta barrage and reservoir at Gajoldoba.

Healthcare
Odlabari Block Primary Health Centre, with 10 beds at PO Panbari, is the major government medical facility in the Mal CD block.

External links

References

Cities and towns in Jalpaiguri district